Starokurmankeyevo (İśke Körmänkäy) is a rural locality (a selo) in Kurmankeyevsky Selsoviet, Davlekanovsky District, Bashkortostan, Russia. The population was 315 as of 2010. There are 4 streets.

Geography 
Starokurmankeyevo is located 10 km south of Davlekanovo (the district's administrative centre) by road. Davlekanovo is the nearest rural locality.

References 

Rural localities in Davlekanovsky District